Michel Weill (31 August 1914 – 21 July 2001) was a French architect who co-founded the Atelier LWD with Guy Lagneau and Jean Dimitrijevic, and was involved in many major projects in France and Africa.
He worked with Lagneau and Dimitrijevic on the Musée-Maison de la Culture at Le Havre, a glass box surrounded by mechanical solar-control devices.
Another project with Lagneau and Dimitrijevic was the Hôtel de France in Conakry, Guinea, a long building flanked by a rotunda. It was built of reinforced concrete panels with aluminum shutters.

Bibliography

References

20th-century French architects
1926 births
2001 deaths